Harpalus nanniscus is a species of ground beetle in the subfamily Harpalinae. It was described by Peringuey in 1896.

References

nanniscus
Beetles described in 1896